Fantasy Island is an American television series that debuted in 1977 as a television film.

Fantasy Island may also refer to:

Amusement and water parks
 in Bangladesh
 Fantasy Island, Bangladesh, in Uttara (Town), Dhaka, Bangladesh

in Singapore
 Fantasy Island, Singapore, a defunct water park formerly located at Sentosa, Singapore

in United Kingdom
 Fantasy Island (UK amusement park), near Skegness, England

in United States
 Fantasy Island (LBI), in Beach Haven, New Jersey, United States
 Niagara Amusement Park & Splash World, formerly known as Fantasy Island, in Grand Island, New York, United States

Entertainment
 "Fantasy Island" (M People song), 1997
 "Fantasy Island" (The Millionaires song), 1982, covered by Tight Fit
 "Fantasy Island", a 1981 song by Herb Alpert
 "Fantasy Island", a 1968 song by Tages
 "Fantasy Island", a 1979 song by Freddy Weller
 "Fantasy Island", a 2003 song by Hieroglyphics from the album Full Circle
 Fantasy Island (film), a 2020 American supernatural adventure-horror film, based on the series
 Fantasy Island, a 1977 American television series
 Fantasy Island (1998 TV series), a 1998 American television series revival of the original 1977 series
 Fantasy Island (2021 TV series), a 2021 American television series reboot of the original 1977 series

See also
 Fantasilandia, an amusement park in Santiago de Chile
 Phantasialand, an amusement park in Brühl, Rhineland, Germany
 Y'all Is Fantasy Island, a Scottish band
 Phantom island, a false island once thought to exist
 "Island Fantasy", a song by Don Patterson from the album Boppin' & Burnin'